Arthur Terman Faircloth (July 8, 1921 – April 1, 2010) was an American football player who played two seasons with the New York Giants of the National Football League (NFL). He was drafted by the Boston Yanks in the 19th round of the 1944 NFL Draft. He first enrolled at Guilford College before transferring to North Carolina State University. Faircloth attended Anacostia High School in Washington, D.C.

References

External links
Just Sports Stats

1921 births
2010 deaths
Players of American football from Richmond, Virginia
American football running backs
Guilford Quakers football players
NC State Wolfpack football players
New York Giants players
People from Southeast (Washington, D.C.)